This Diamond Ring is the debut studio album by American band Gary Lewis & the Playboys, and was released in 1965 on Liberty Records, LRP-3408. It is the first of three charting albums released by the band in 1965.

Background
The group was formed in 1964 and was originally known as Gary & the Playboys. Producer Snuff Garrett saw them performing at Disneyland and he brought them into the studio to record the single "This Diamond Ring". He also had the band change their name to Gary Lewis & the Playboys to capitalize on Gary's famous father, comedian/actor Jerry Lewis. The success of the single led them to record a whole album of mostly covers of popular songs by the Kinks, Bobby Rydell, the Coasters, and others. The album was the second highest charting original album of their career. The single "This Diamond Ring" launched a string of seven Top 10 hits for the group.

The album is somewhat notable in that it marked the beginning of long successful careers for musicians Al Kooper and Leon Russell.

Dispute regarding musicians on the album
Over the years, there has been much discussion regarding the roles of various musicians used on the album sessions. Garrett used The Wrecking Crew as session players on the whole album. Lewis has stated in interviews:  Producer Garrett remembers it differently, stating:  There is also a question regarding whether Carol Kaye contributed bass on some tracks.

Track listing
 "This Diamond Ring" (Al Kooper, Bob Brass, Irwin Levine) – 2:05 (Kooper's name is misspelled on the original vinyl labels)
 "Dream Lover" (Bobby Darin) – 2:23
 "All Day and All of the Night" (Ray Davies) – 1:52
 "Forget Him" (Mark Anthony) – 2:10
 "Needles and Pins" (Jack Nitzsche, Sonny Bono) – 2:00
 "Love Potion Number 9" (Jerry Leiber, Mike Stoller) – 1:51 
 "Keep Searchin'" (Del Shannon) – 1:54
 "The Birds and the Bees" (Barry Stuart) – 2:01
 "Sweet Little Rock And Roller" (Chuck Berry) – 2:17
 "Go To Him" (Sonny Curtis, Tom Lesslie) – 2:00
 "The Night Has A Thousand Eyes" (Ben Weisman, Dottie Wayne, Marilyn Garrett) – 3:02 
 "The Best Man" (Cliff Crofford) – 2:21

Personnel

Gary Lewis and the Playboys
 Gary Lewis – vocals, drums
 Dave Walker – rhythm guitar, vocals
 Dave Costell – lead guitar
 Al Ramsay – bass
 John R. West – electric cordovox

These were the Playboys at the time of the recording, although many session musicians were also used.

Additional musicians
 Ron Hicklin – vocals

The Wrecking Crew
 Leon Russell – keyboards, arrangements
 Hal Blaine – drums
 Tommy Allsup – guitar
 Mike Deasy – guitar
 Joe Osborn – bass

Technical
 Snuff Garrett – music producer, liner notes
 "Bones" Howe – engineer
 H. Bowen David, Henry Lewy – assistant engineers
 Sam Jacobson – cover design
 Bud Fraker – photography

Charts

Singles

References

1964 debut albums
Gary Lewis & the Playboys albums
Liberty Records albums
Albums produced by Snuff Garrett